STG may refer to:

Media
 Shoot 'em up, (shooting game) a subgenre of the shooter genre of video games
 Strike Gunner S.T.G, an arcade video game developed by Athena

Military
 Sonar Technician surface, United States Navy rating
 Sturmgewehr (StG), German assault rifle
 Sturzkampfgeschwader (StG), in Organization of the Luftwaffe (1933–45)

Organizations
 School of Transnational Governance, School established in 2017 as part of the European University Institute
 Security Threat Group, a prison gang
 Somali Telecom Group, a Somalia telecommunications company
 Scandinavian Tobacco Group, a Danish cigar and tobacco company
 Special Tactics Group, a New Zealand Police counter-terrorism group
 Slaves to Gravity, a UK band
 Symphony Technology Group, an American private equity firm

Science and technology
 Superior temporal gyrus in the human brain
 Stomatogastric ganglion in arthropods
 Steam turbine generator, an electric generator 
 Spineless Tagless G-machine in the Glasgow Haskell Compiler
 Signal Transition Graph, a special type of Petri net

Other uses
 An abbreviation for sterling, the currency of the United Kingdom
 St. George Airport (Alaska), IATA code
 Stirling railway station, Scotland, station code
 Star Trek Generations, a 1995 American science fiction film.